Green Lake Water Aerodrome  is located on Green Lake east of 70 Mile House in the Cariboo region of British Columbia, Canada. It is a private airport operated by the Flying U Guest Ranch.

See also
Green Lake Aerodrome
Whistler/Green Lake Water Aerodrome

References

External links
 Flying U Guest Ranch, 70 Mile House, BC, Canada

Seaplane bases in British Columbia
Thompson-Nicola Regional District
Registered aerodromes in British Columbia